Ein Yabrud is a Palestinian town in the Ramallah and al-Bireh Governorate in the central West Bank. It is located approximately 7 km northeast of the city of Ramallah and its elevation is 800 m. According to the Palestinian Central Bureau of Statistics (PCBS) the town had a population of 3,000 in 2007.

Location
It is bordered by Rammun and Taybeh  to the east, Yabrud and Silwad  to the north, Dura al-Qar' to the west, and Deir Dibwan, Beitin and Al-Bireh  to the south.

History
Sherds from the Hellenistic, Roman and  Byzantine eras have been found here.  A grave, with three arcosolia, and with coins from the reign of   Constantine the Great have been excavated here.

Sherds from the Umayyad, Crusader/Ayyubid and Mamluk eras have also been found.

Yaqut noted about Ein Yabrud and  Yabrud: "A village lying north of Jerusalem, on the road from the Holy City to Nabulus, between which and Yabrud is Kafar Natha. It possesses orchards and vineyards, and olives and Sumach trees."

Ottoman era
Ein Yabrud, like the rest of Palestine, was incorporated into the Ottoman Empire in 1517, and in the census of 1596, the village was noted in the Nahiya of Quds of the Liwa of Quds under the name of Ayn Ibrud. The population was 24 households, all Muslim. The villagers paid a fixed tax rate of 33.3% on various agricultural products, such as wheat, barley, olive trees, vineyards, fruit trees, goats and/or beehives, in addition to "occasional revenues"; a total of 8,700  akçe.Toledano, 1984, p. 289, gives the location as 31°57′15″N 35°14′20″E, noting a spring called Ayn Abrud  located nearby, at 31°57′00″N 35°13′40″E

In 1838, Edward Robinson  noted Ein Yabrud "on the top of a hill". It was further noted as Muslim village,   located in the Beni Murrah region, north of Jerusalem.

In 1863 Victor Guérin found it to have 800 inhabitants. He further noted that a number of houses were built with antique materials.

Socin found from an official Ottoman village list from about 1870 that the village had 66 houses and a population of 282, though the population count only included men. It was further noted that it was located one hour north of Beitin.Hartmann, 1883, p.  115 noted  67  houses

In 1882 the PEF's Survey of Western Palestine (SWP) described '''Ain Yebrud as: "A village of moderate size on the top of a hill, well built, surrounded with fine groves of olives, with a well on the north-east."

In 1896 the population of Ain jabrud''  was estimated to be about 573 persons.

British Mandate  era
In the 1922 census of Palestine, conducted by the British Mandate authorities, the population numbered 576 Muslims, increasing in the 1931 census to 788 inhabitants, in 178 houses.

In the 1945 statistics Ein Yabrud had a population of 930 Muslims, and a total land area of 11,488 dunams.   3,151 dunams were for plantations and irrigable land, 3,632 for cereals, while 88 dunams were built-up areas.

Jordanian era
In the wake of the 1948 Arab–Israeli War, and after the 1949 Armistice Agreements, Ein Yabrud came under  Jordanian rule. Jordan confiscated lands of Ein Yabrud and nearby Silwad for the construction of a military camp before the Six-Day War.

The Jordanian census of 1961 found 1,501 inhabitants in Ein Yabrud.

Post-1967
Since the Six-Day War in 1967, Ein Yabrud has been under Israeli occupation.

After the 1995 accords, 34.3% of  village land is classified as Area B land, while the remaining 65.7% is classified as Area C.

Israel has confiscated land from Ein Yarbrud for two settlements: 1,252 dunams for Ofra and 137 dunams for Beit El.

The Jordanian buildings formed the initial basis of the Israeli settlement of Ofra founded in 1975. Plans for further expansion of Ofra in this land in 2011 resulted in legal challenges and public dispute. Land belonging to the residents of the village has been used to construct hundreds of structures in the neighbouring Israeli settlement of Ofra.

Ein Yabrud is the home village of Hamas military commander Maher Udda.

References

Bibliography

External links
Welcome to 'Ayn Yabrud
Survey of Western Palestine, Map 14:  IAA, Wikimedia commons
 'Ein Yabrud village (fact sheet),  Applied Research Institute–Jerusalem (ARIJ)
‘Ein Yabrud village profile, ARIJ
 ‘Ein Yabrud, aerial photo, ARIJ

Villages in the West Bank
Municipalities of the State of Palestine